Sebastian Mladen (born 11 December 1991) is a Romanian professional footballer who plays as a defensive midfielder or a defender for Super League Greece club Panetolikos.

Career statistics

Club

Honours

Club
Viitorul Constanța
Liga I: 2016–17
Cupa României: 2018–19
Supercupa României: 2019

References

External links

1991 births
Living people
People from Calafat
Association football defenders
Romanian footballers
Romanian expatriate footballers
Romania under-21 international footballers
Expatriate footballers in Italy
Expatriate footballers in Portugal
Expatriate footballers in Greece
Romanian expatriate sportspeople in Italy
Romanian expatriate sportspeople in Portugal
Romanian expatriate sportspeople in Greece
A.S. Roma players
AFC Chindia Târgoviște players
S.C. Olhanense players
F.C. Südtirol players
FC Viitorul Constanța players
FCV Farul Constanța players
Panetolikos F.C. players
Liga I players
Primeira Liga players
Serie C players
Super League Greece players